Jim Miller (born November 10, 1947) is an American skier. He competed in the Nordic combined event at the 1968 Winter Olympics and the 1972 Winter Olympics.

References

External links
 

1947 births
Living people
American male Nordic combined skiers
Olympic Nordic combined skiers of the United States
Nordic combined skiers at the 1968 Winter Olympics
Nordic combined skiers at the 1972 Winter Olympics
Sportspeople from Syracuse, New York